In computing, text attributes (in the sense of attributes of a text) are some data associated with particular chunks of text, except of its characters itself. Say, something more than a plain text.
 See formatted text for text attributes in word processing.
 See HTML#Elements and HTML attribute about text attributes in HTML.
 See text mode for hardware-implemented screen text attributes;
 particularly, VGA compatible text mode describes such text attributes on PC compatibles.
Also, a text attribute may refer to an attribute (e.g. to an XML attribute), those value consists of a text.